La Parisienne also known as the Minoan Lady, is part of the Camp Stool Fresco, which was probably painted on the wall of the Sanctuary Hall on the Piano Nobile at the palace of Knossos. The sacral knot worn at the back of the neck seems to indicate that she is a priestess or even a goddess.
The archaeological research in Minoan palaces, cemeteries and settlements has brought to light a multitude of objects related to beautification.  Edmond Pottier gave her the name as he felt she resembled a contemporary woman from Paris.

It seems that there were beautification areas in the palaces of Knossos, Zakros and Pylos. These beauty objects were used during the whole Aegean Bronze Age. By using these objects, the Minoan ladies highlighted the red lips and the white of the face. In the fresco of the Parisienne, the use of the black colour for emphasizing the form of the eyes and red for the lips can clearly be seen.

It dates to the Final Palatial Period, ca. 1450–1350/1300 B.C., and is currently in the Herakleion Archaeological Museum.

See also
 List of Aegean frescos

Bibliography
A. Evans, The Palace of Minos at Knossos III repr. New York 1964
A. Papaefthymiou-Papanthimou Utensils and toiletries of the Cretan-Mycenaean Age, Thessaloniki 1979 
Poursat, J.C., Les Ivoires myceniens, Paris 1977
Palmer L, The Interpretation of Mycenaean Greek Texts, Oxford 1963.

External links
"Minoan woman or goddess from the palace of Knossos (“La Parisienne”)" by Senta German, Khan Academy 
Greek thesaurus - Minoan civilization
Kathimerini newspaper - 7 days
Herakleion Archaeological Museum

15th-century BC works
14th-century BC works
Minoan frescos
Heraklion Archaeological Museum
Knossos
Portraits of women